The tribe Sophoreae is one of the subdivisions of the plant family Fabaceae. Traditionally this tribe has been used as a wastebasket taxon to accommodate genera of Faboideae which exhibit actinomorphic, rather than zygomorphic floral symmetry and/or incompletely differentiated petals and free stamens. Various morphological and molecular analyses indicated that Sophoreae as traditionally circumscribed was polyphyletic. This led to a re-circumscription of Sophoreae, which resulted in the transfer of many genera to other tribes (Amburaneae, Angylocalyceae, Baphieae, Camoensieae, the Cladrastis clade, Exostyleae, Leptolobieae, Ormosieae, Podalyrieae, and the Vataireoids). This also necessitated the inclusion of two former tribes, Euchresteae and Thermopsideae, in the new definition of Sophoreae. Tribe Sophoreae, as currently circumscribed, consistently forms a monophyletic clade in molecular phylogenetic analyses. The Sophoreae arose 40.8 ± 2.4 million years ago (in the Eocene).

Description of morphological synapomorphies has yet to be undertaken, but members of this tribe can be distinguished by the relatively simple flowers, unspecialized pinnate leaves, accumulation of quinolizidine alkaloids, and the presence of free stamens. The tribe does have a node-based definition: the crown clade originating from the most recent common ancestor of Bolusanthus speciosus (Bolus) Harms and Sophora davidii (Franch.) Pavol..

Genera
Sophoreae comprises the following genera:

 Ammodendron Fisch. ex DC.
 Ammopiptanthus S. H. Cheng
 Ammothamnus Bunge

 Anagyris L.

 Baptisia Vent.
 Bolusanthus Harms

 Dicraeopetalum Harms

 Euchresta (Lesch.) Benn.

 Maackia Rupr.

 Neoharmsia R.Vig.

 Piptanthus Sweet
 Platycelyphium Harms

 Salweenia Baker f.
 Sophora L.

 Thermopsis R.Br.

 Vuralia Uysal & Ertugrul

Notes

References

External links

 
Fabaceae tribes